Hoving is a surname. Notable people with the surname include:

Evert Hoving (born 1953), Dutch middle-distance runner
Lucas Hoving (1912–2000), Dutch dancer and choreographer
Thomas Hoving (1931–2009), director of the Metropolitan Museum of Art. Son of Walter Hoving
Walter Hoving (1897–1989), head of Tiffany & Co. Father of Thomas Hoving